Frank Kruesi is the former President of the Chicago Transit Authority. He resigned in April 2007 after serving 9½ years. He is now an Adjunct Faculty member at the University of Chicago's Harris School of Public Policy. Prior to his time at CTA, he was the Assistant Secretary for Transportation Policy for the U.S. Department of Transportation.

References

Frank Kruesi

University of Chicago faculty
Living people
Year of birth missing (living people)
Chicago Transit Authority